Energy efficiency may refer to:

 Energy efficiency (physics), the ratio between the useful output and input of an energy conversion process
 Electrical efficiency, useful power output per electrical power consumed
 Mechanical efficiency, a ratio of the measured performance to the performance of an ideal machine 
 Thermal efficiency, the extent to which the energy added by heat is converted to net work output or vice versa
 Luminous efficiency, a measure of how well a light source produces visible light
 Fuel efficiency, the efficiency of converting potential energy in a fuel into kinetic energy
 Energy efficiency in transportation, the fuel economy of various modes of transportation
 Energy-efficient landscaping, a type of landscaping designed for the purpose of conserving energy
 Efficient energy use, minimizing the amount of energy used for a given, constant energy service
 Energy conservation, reducing energy consumption by using less of an energy service

See also
 Energy (disambiguation)
 Efficiency (disambiguation)
 Energy rating (disambiguation)